"God Is a Woman" (stylized in sentence case as "God is a woman") is a song by American singer Ariana Grande. It was released on July 13, 2018, as the second single from Grande's fourth studio album Sweetener (2018). The song was written by Grande, Max Martin, Savan Kotecha, Rickard Göransson and its producer Ilya.

"God Is a Woman" debuted at number 11 and later reached a peak of number eight, becoming Grande's tenth top-10 single on the US Billboard Hot 100. It became her fourth single to top the US Mainstream Top 40 airplay chart. The song also attained a top-10 peak within the charts of 17 countries, including number one in Greece, Iceland and Israel, number four in the United Kingdom, Ireland, Singapore and Malaysia, number five in Australia, Canada, Hungary and New Zealand, as well as reaching the top-twenty in Austria, Denmark, Norway, the Netherlands, and Switzerland. The single is certified Platinum in six countries in addition to Double Diamond in Brazil. The song was nominated for Best Pop Solo Performance at the 61st Annual Grammy Awards.

Background and release

"God Is a Woman" was first teased in a scene in the music video for lead single "No Tears Left to Cry", which displayed what appears to be a working track listing for the upcoming album. Grande confirmed the title on The Tonight Show Starring Jimmy Fallon on May 1, 2018. On June 27, Grande revealed that the song would become the official second single from her album. She initially announced on Twitter that the song would be released on July 20, however, she later confirmed the release date as July 13. During an interview with SiriusXM's Radio Andy, Camila Cabello commented that "God Is a Woman" was initially written for her, but eventually stating that "it didn't end up sounding right for me." The original version by Cabello eventually leaked online in 2023.

Composition and lyrics
"God Is a Woman" is a midtempo song that runs for three minutes and 17 seconds. It was characterized as a pop-hip hop hybrid track that blends "trip hoppy-R&B" and soft rock with influences of reggae over "hypnotic" trap-pop production. Time described the song as "an anthemic, sultry banger", and noted that "Grande's voice is layered so that it sounds like a choir, but really, it's only her, multiplied." The song contains assertive lyrics embracing her femininity and intertwining themes of sexuality and spirituality.

The song is performed in the key of E minor with a tempo of 145 beats per minute in common time. The song follows a chord progression of Em – D/E – Em – D/E – Cmaj7 – D/C –Am7 – Bm7, and Grande's vocals span from E3 to E6.

Critical reception
The song received widespread acclaim from critics and fans alike. Mike Nied of Idolator described it as "a sexually liberated bop", writing: "The beat picks up as [Grande] moves into the chorus. Incorporating a hip-hop edge, her voice gets progressively breathier. Although the single is obviously a sexy banger, it also includes a resilient message. In the face of critics, she defiantly takes a stand." Bryan Rolli of Forbes.com called it "an impressive show of both virtuosity and restraint" and "one of the best pop songs of the summer—if not the year". He also praised Grande's vocal performance "sprinkling her signature falsetto across the sultry chorus and reining in her vocal acrobatics in the verses. She tries on different flows at her whim, singing slow, seductive come-ons ("I can tell that you know I know how I want it") and riffing on Migos' triplet flow in the pre-choruses. The track is full of chilly, hypnotic trap beats, tasteful drops and electronic squawks, atop which Grande harmonizes with herself to suck listeners into the world she's created for three-and-a-half minutes. [Grande] performs with a maturity that her last two singles lacked, taking a fairly simple formula—heroic female pop vocals plus entrancing trap beats—and turning it into a bite-sized masterpiece. The track probably won't put to bed any controversial theological debates, but it sure made a lot of people believe in something tonight."

Accolades

Commercial performance
Upon release, "God Is a Woman" began receiving early radio support in the United States. The song drew in 172 spins from 52 Mediabase-monitored pop stations across the country on the final tracking period days. On the issue dated July 28, 2018, "God Is a Woman" debuted at number 11 on the Billboard Hot 100 chart, selling 43,000 digital downloads during its opening week, allowing it to enter the Digital Songs chart at number four while starting on the Streaming Songs chart at number 11 with 25.1 million US streams. In its second week, the song fell 10 positions to number 21 on the Hot 100. The song also entered Billboards Mainstream Top 40 at number 27, moving up to number 23 the following week. It later reached number one on the chart, becoming Grande's eleventh top-10 single and fourth to reach the summit of the chart. In March 2019, "God Is a Woman" was certified double platinum by the Recording Industry Association of America for shipments exceeding two million units in the United States.

Following the release of Sweetener and its performance at the 2018 MTV Video Music Awards on August 20, 2018, "God Is a Woman" jumped 22 positions on the Hot 100 from number 30 to number 8, becoming Grande's tenth top-ten single there and placing her as the twelfth overall artist and seventh female artist with the most Hot 100 top 10s in the 2010s decade. The song subsequently rose to number 8 on Streaming Songs and climbed to number 39 on Billboard Radio Songs that week. It has since reached number six there, earning Grande her ninth top-10 on the Radio Songs chart and giving her the most top 10s among women since her first, "Problem" in June 2014, surpassing Taylor Swift who has amassed eight since that date. On the Billboard Dance Club Songs, "God Is a Woman" debuted at number 42 on the issue dated August 25, 2018, climbing to number 31 the following week. The song later topped the chart, becoming her second consecutive number one and third overall; consequently, Sweetener became her first album to spawn multiple top 10s on that chart. Similarly, the track also peaked at number six on the US Dance/Mix Show Airplay chart. In Canada, the song debuted at number five on the Canadian Hot 100.

In the United Kingdom, "God Is a Woman" entered the Official Trending Chart at number one following its release, with the song set to debut in the top 10 of the chart regardless of any added points. On July 20, 2018, the song opened at number four on the UK Singles Chart, where it became her seventh top-ten single in the country.
It also debuted on the UK R&B chart at number two, becoming her highest-charting entry there. Similarly, it entered the Irish Singles Chart at number four, and at number eight on the Scottish Singles Chart. In Australia, the song debuted at its peak of number five on the ARIA Charts, marking her seventh top-10 entry there as well.

Music video
The lyric video for "God Is a Woman" premiered on Grande's YouTube channel alongside the release of the single. The video visualizes a cloud-filled background that transitions to a cosmic scene, ending with a still shot of the singer. The official music video was released later the same day. It was directed by Dave Meyers and features a monologue by Madonna, where she paraphrases the version of Ezekiel 25:17 that appears in the movie Pulp Fiction. The video pays homage to The Creation of Adam, Romulus and Remus, astronomy, female genitalia, and other visual imagery similar to that of "No Tears Left to Cry", also directed by Meyers, as well as Greek mythology. Alexa Meade painted Grande for the music video. The video has been viewed more than 300 million times.

Live performances

Grande performed "God Is a Woman" for the first time on August 20, 2018, at the 2018 MTV Video Music Awards at Radio City Music Hall in New York City. The performance was themed around the Last Supper and Grande was accompanied onstage with over 50 female dancers. Grande was joined by her mother Joan, grandmother Marjorie and cousin Lani towards the end of the performance and after Grande finished singing, the four of them bowed together before exiting the stage. She also performed an acoustic version of the song the same week on Good Morning America.

"God Is a Woman" was included on the set list for The Sweetener Sessions, a promotional tour in support of her Sweetener album. The song is also included as the set opener of her Sweetener World Tour (2019) with a performance similar to her VMAs performance.

Credits and personnel
Credits adapted from Tidal.

 Ariana Grande – vocals, background vocals, songwriting
 Ilya Salmanzadeh – production, songwriting, programming, keyboards, bass, drums, guitar, background vocals
 Max Martin – songwriting
 Rickard Goransson – guitar, songwriting 
 John Hanes – mix engineering
 Sam Holland – engineering
 Jeremy Lertola – assistant recording engineer
 Cory Bice – assistant recording engineer
 Serban Ghenea – mixing

Charts

Weekly charts

Monthly charts

Year-end charts

Certifications

Release history

Cover versions
 On March 25, 2022, New Zealand pop singer Benee covered "God Is a Woman" for Australian youth broadcaster Triple J's segment Like a Version, in addition to a performance of her song "Never Ending".

See also
 List of Billboard Hot 100 top-ten singles in 2018
 List of Billboard Mainstream Top 40 number-one songs of 2018
 List of Billboard Dance Club Songs number ones of 2018

Notes

References

External links
 

2018 singles
2018 songs
American hip hop songs
American pop songs
Ariana Grande songs
Benee songs
Music videos directed by Dave Meyers (director)
Number-one singles in Iceland
Number-one singles in Israel
Republic Records singles
Song recordings produced by Ilya Salmanzadeh
Songs critical of religion
Songs with feminist themes
Songs written by Ariana Grande
Songs written by Ilya Salmanzadeh
Songs written by Max Martin
Songs written by Rickard Göransson
Songs written by Savan Kotecha